The Desaguadero River, also known as Risawariru or Uchusumain, is a river shared between Bolivia and Peru. It drains Lake Titicaca from the southern part of the river basin, flowing south and draining approximately five percent of the lake's flood waters into Lake Uru Uru and Lake Poopó. Its source in the north is very near the Peruvian border.

It is navigable only by small craft and supports indigenous communities such as the Uru Muratu community.

See also 
 Awallamaya Lake
 Desaguadero River (Argentina) from Argentina.

Notes

External links

Management issues in the Lake Titicaca and Lake Poopo system: Importance of developing a water budget

Rivers of Peru
Rivers of La Paz Department (Bolivia)
Rivers of Oruro Department
International rivers of South America
Rivers of Puno Region
Altiplano